Leo Moritsevich Ginzburg (Лео Морицевич Гинзбург) (Warsaw, Vistula Land, Russian Empire April 12, 1901 – Moscow, Soviet Union November 1, 1979)  was a Soviet conductor and pianist of Polish Jewish origin. He conducted the Moscow State Symphony Orchestra (МГАСО) after Lev Steinberg and Nikolai Anosov.

His students at the Moscow Conservatory included among others Michail Jurowski, Nikolai Korndorf, Fuat Mansurov, Alexander Anisimov, Leonid Grin, Vladimir Fedoseyev, and the Chinese conductor Cao Peng.

He conducted, on occasion, the USSR State Radio Symphony Orchestra, and was noted for recordings of Tchaikovsky.

Recordings
 Tchaikovsky: Symphony in E flat;
 Tchaikovsky: Symphony no.7
 Alexander Glasunow (1865-1936): Carnaval Ouverture op. 45 with S. Sherman, orgue, Moscow Radio Symphony Orchestra

References

1901 births
1979 deaths
Musicians from Warsaw
People from Warsaw Governorate
20th-century Polish Jews
20th-century Polish pianists
20th-century Russian conductors (music)
Russian male conductors (music)
20th-century Russian male musicians